This is a list of learned societies in the United States.

References

 
Learned societies